The 13th Youth in Film Awards ceremony (now known as the Young Artist Awards), presented by the Youth in Film Association, honored outstanding youth performers under the age of 21 in the fields of film and television for the 1990–1991 season, and took place on December 1, 1991, at the Academy of Television Arts & Sciences in North Hollywood, California.

Established in 1978 by long-standing Hollywood Foreign Press Association member, Maureen Dragone, the Youth in Film Association was the first organization to establish an awards ceremony specifically set to recognize and award the contributions of performers under the age of 21 in the fields of film, television, theater and music.

Categories
★ Bold indicates the winner in each category.

Best Young Performer in a Motion Picture

Best Young Actor Starring in a Motion Picture
★ Ethan Randall Embry – Dutch (20th Century Fox)
 Jonathan Brandis – The NeverEnding Story II: The Next Chapter (Warner Bros)
 Balthazar Getty – My Heroes Have Always Been Cowboys (Samuel-Goldwyn)
 Lukas Haas – Rambling Rose (Seven Arts Pictures)
 Stian Smestad – Shipwrecked (Walt Disney)
 Robert J. Steinmiller Jr. – Bingo (TriStar)
 Elijah Wood – Paradise (Buena Vista)

Best Young Actress Starring in a Motion Picture
★ Thora Birch – Paradise (Buena Vista)
 Mikki Allen – Regarding Henry (Paramount)
 Angela Goethals – V.I. Warshawki (Buena Vista)
 Milla Jovovich – Return to the Blue Lagoon (Columbia)
 Heather Graham – Shout (Universal)
 Reese Witherspoon – The Man in the Moon (MGM)

Best Young Actor Co-Starring in a Motion Picture
★ Daniel Newman – Robin Hood: Prince of Thieves (Warner Bros)
 Michael Bacall – Shout (Universal)
 Kenny Blank – The Super (20th Century Fox)
 Danny Cooksey – Terminator 2: Judgment Day (TriStar)
Gregor Hesse – Dead Again (Paramount)
 Kenny Morrison – The NeverEnding Story II: The Next Chapter (Warner Bros)
 Ernie Reyes, Jr. – Teenage Mutant Ninja Turtles II: The Secret of the Ooze (New Line Cinema)

Best Young Actress Co-Starring in a Motion Picture
★ Sheila Rosenthal – Not Without My Daughter (MGM)
Louisa Haigh – Shipwrecked (Walt Disney)
 Lisa Jakub – Rambling Rose (Seven Arts Pictures)
 Danielle Harris – Don't Tell Mom the Babysitter's Dead (Warner Bros)
 Ivyann Schwan – Problem Child 2 (Universal)
 Emily Warfield – The Man in the Moon (MGM)

Best Young Performer in a TV Movie or Special

Best Young Actor Starring in a television film
★ Lukas Haas – The Perfect Tribute (ABC)
 Lane Davis – Triumph of the Heart: The Ricky Bell Story (CBS)
 Matthew Lawrence – The Summer My Father Grew Up (NBC)
 Ryan Todd – Mrs. Lambert Remembers Love (CBS)

Best Young Actress Starring in a TV Movie
★ Ariana Richards – Switched at Birth (NBC)
 Kimberly Cullum – The Sitter (FOX)
 Erika Flores – Switched at Birth (NBC)
 Jenny Lewis – Runaway Father (CBS)

Best Young Actor Starring in a Cable Special
★ Eugene Byrd – Perfect Harmony (Disney Channel)
 Joey Lawrence – Chains of Gold
 Jared Rushton – A Cry in the Wild (PBS)
 Justin Whalin – Perfect Harmony (Disney Channel)

Best Young Actress Starring in a Cable Special
★ Sarah Sawatsky – The Girl From Mars (Atlantic Films)
 Olivia Burnette – Final Verdict (TNT)
Nicki Vannice – Sapphire Man
Juliet Sorcey – Never Forget (TNT)

Best Young Performer in a Television Series

Best Young Actor Starring in a Television Series
★ Neil Patrick Harris – Doogie Howser, M.D. (ABC)
 Jay R. Ferguson – Evening Shade (CBS)
 Johnny Galecki – American Dreamer (NBC)
 Omri Katz – Eerie, Indiana (NBC)
 Corin Nemec – Parker Lewis Can't Lose (FOX)
 Scott Weinger – The Family Man (CBS)

Best Young Actress Starring in a Television Series
★ Kellie Martin – Life Goes On (ABC)
 Maia Brewton – Parker Lewis Can't Lose (FOX)
 Shannen Doherty – Beverly Hills, 90210 (FOX)
 Candace Hutson – Evening Shade (CBS)
 Marisa Ryan – Major Dad (CBS)

Outstanding Young Comedian in a Television Series
★ Adam Jeffries – True Colors (FOX)
 David Faustino – Married... with Children (FOX)
 Seth Green – Good & Evil (ABC)

Outstanding Young Comedienne in a Television Series
★ Sara Gilbert – Roseanne (ABC)
 Tatyana M. Ali – The Fresh Prince of Bel-Air (NBC)
 Kellie Shanygne Williams – Family Matters (CBS)

Best Young Actor Starring in a New Television Series
★ Trevor Bullock – Davis Rules (ABC)
 Brandon Call – Step by Step (CBS)
 Danny Gerard – Brooklyn Bridge (CBS)
 Joey Lawrence – Blossom (NBC)
 Larenz Tate – The Royal Family (CBS)

Best Young Actress Starring in a New Television Series
★ Sylver Gregory – The Royal Family (CBS)
 Meghan Andrews – Flesh 'n' Blood (NBC)
 Mayim Bialik – Blossom (NBC)
 Olivia Burnette – The Torkelsons (NBC)
 Staci Keanan – Step by Step (CBS)
Ashlee Levitch – I'll Fly Away (NBC)

Best Young Actor Starring in an Off-Prime Time or Cable Series
★ Richard Ian Cox – The Adventures of the Black Stallion (Family Channel)
Robert Gavin – Land of the Lost (ABC)
 Mark-Paul Gosselaar – Saved by the Bell (NBC)
 Mario Lopez – Saved by the Bell (NBC)
 Will Nipper – The New Lassie (KCOP)
 Sean O'Neal – Clarissa Explains It All (Nickelodeon)
 Jaimz Woolvett – Dog House (Accolade Releasing)

Best Young Actress Starring in an Off-Prime Time or Cable Series
★ Melissa Joan Hart – Clarissa Explains It All (Nickelodeon)
 Elizabeth Berkley – Saved by the Bell (NBC)
Wendy Cox – The New Lassie (KCOP)
Jenny Drugan – Land of the Lost (ABC)
Carol Ann Plante – Harry and the Hendersons (FOX)
 Tiffani-Amber Thiessen – Saved by the Bell (NBC)
 Lark Voorhies – Saved by the Bell (NBC)

Best Young Actor Co-Starring in a Television Series
★ Brian Austin Green – Beverly Hills 90210 (FOX)
Dustin Berkovitz – Sisters (NBC)
 Leonardo DiCaprio – Growing Pains (ABC)
 Jeremy Jackson – Baywatch (Syndication)
Rigoberto Jimenez – Davis Rules (ABC)
 Christopher Pettiet – The Young Riders (ABC)
 Justin Shenkarow – Eerie, Indiana (NBC)

Best Young Actress Co-Starring in a Television Series
★ Jennie Garth – Beverly Hills, 90210 (FOX)
 Andrea Barber – Full House (ABC)
 Danica McKellar – The Wonder Years (ABC)
 Lisa Rieffel – The Trials of Rosie O'Neill (CBS)
 Lisa Dean Ryan – Doogie Howser, M.D. (ABC)
 Tori Spelling – Beverly Hills, 90210 (FOX)
 Jenna von Oÿ – Blossom (NBC)

Best Young Actor Co-Starring in an Off-Prime Time or Cable Series
★ Zachary Bostrom – Harry and the Hendersons (FOX)
Andrew Bednarski – Rin Tin Tin K-9 Cops (CTV)
Jordan Christopher Michael – Sessions
Kevin Osgood – The Mickey Mouse Club (Disney Channel)
Avi Phillips – Maniac Mansion (Family Channel)
Josiah Trager – Big Brother Jake (Family Channel)
 Jason Zimbler – Clarissa Explains It All (Nickelodeon)

Best Young Actress Co-Starring in an Off-Prime Time or Cable Series
★ Gabrielle Carmouche – Big Brother Jake (Family Channel)
Valentina Cardinalli – Dog House (Accolade Releasing)
 Jennifer Crystal – Sessions
 Kathleen Robertson – Maniac Mansion (Family Channel)

Best Young Actor Guest-Starring or Recurring Role in a TV Series
★ Brandon Crane – The Wonder Years (ABC)
 Brandon Quintin Adams – Drexell's Class (FOX)
 Tevin Campbell – The Fresh Prince of Bel-Air (NBC)
Grant Gelt – Northern Exposure (CBS)
John Christian Graas – The New Zorro (Family Channel)
 Jason Marsden – Anything But Love (ABC)
 Michael Oliver – Drexell's Class (FOX)
 Justin Whalin – Blossom (NBC)

Best Young Actress Guest-Starring or Recurring Role in a TV Series
★ Robin Lynn Heath – Davis Rules (ABC)
 Erika Flores – The Owl (Lorimar)
 Ami Foster – Empty Nest (NBC)
Lisa Gerber – The Wonder Years (ABC)
 Crystal McKellar – The Wonder Years (ABC)
 Alisan Porter – The Golden Girls (NBC)
Jodi Peterson – The New Lassie (KCOP)
 Tori Spelling – Saved by the Bell (NBC)

Best Young Actor in a Daytime Series
★ Scott Groff – Days of Our Lives (NBC)
Bryan Buffinton – Guiding Light (CBS)
Brandon Farmer – Santa Barbara (NBC)
Glenn Walker Harris Jr. – General Hospital (ABC)
Tommy Michaels – All My Children (ABC)

Best Young Actress in a Daytime Series
★ Rachel Miner – Guiding Light (CBS)
Suzanne Ekerling – General Hospital (ABC)
 Irene Ng – All My Children (ABC)
 Ashley Peldon – Guiding Light (CBS)
Vicki Wauchope – Santa Barbara (NBC)

Outstanding Voice-Over in an Animation Series
★ Joshua Wiener – Back to the Future: The Animated Series (CBS)
 Chris Allport – Peter Pan and the Pirates (FOX)
 Anndi McAfee – Dink, the Little Dinosaur (CBS)
 Jason Marsden – Peter Pan and the Pirates (FOX)
 Janna Michaels – TaleSpin (Disney Channel)
 R.J. Williams – TaleSpin (Disney Channel)

Best Young Performer Under 10 Years of Age

Exceptional Performance by a Young Actor Under 10
★ Taran Noah Smith – Home Improvement (ABC)
John Aaron Bennett – I'll Fly Away (NBC)
 Tahj Mowry – Full House (ABC)
 Lee Norris – The Torkelsons (NBC)
Jacob Parker – Evening Shade (CBS)
Matthew Louis Seigel – Brooklyn Bridge (CBS)

Exceptional Performance by a Young Actress Under 10
★ Mary-Kate and Ashley Olsen – Full House (ABC)
Rachel Duncan – The Torkelsons (NBC)
 Ashley Johnson – Growing Pains (ABC)
Amber Rose Kelly – The Girl Who Came Between Them (NBC)
Bethany Richards – Switched at Birth (NBC)
 Naya Rivera – The Royal Family (CBS)

Best Young Ensemble Performance

Outstanding Young Ensemble Cast in a Motion Picture
★ Boyz n the Hood (Columbia) – Desi Arnez Hines II, Baha Jackson and Donovan McCrary Don't Tell Mom the Babysitter's Dead (Warner Bros) – Christina Applegate, Christopher Pettiet, Danielle Harris, Keith Coogan and Robert Hy Gorman
 Toy Soldiers (TriStar) – Sean Astin, Wil Wheaton, Keith Coogan, T.E. Russell and George Perez

Outstanding Young Ensemble Cast in a Television Series
★ Beverly Hills, 90210 (FOX) Full House (ABC)
 Step by Step (ABC)
 Drexell's Class (FOX)
 Saved by the Bell (NBC)
 Salute Your Shorts (Nickelodeon)

Best Young Hosts for a Variety or Game Show

Outstanding Hosts for a Youth Variety or Game Show
★ Wild and Crazy Kids (Nickelodeon) – Omar Gooding, Jessica Gaynes and Donnie Jeffcoat Wide World of Kids – Jason Hervey and Scott Grimes
 Youthquake (USA Network) – Jennifer Spears
 Wake, Rattle, and Roll (Disney Channel) – R.J. Williams

Best Family Television Entertainment

Best New Family Television Series
★ Brooklyn Bridge (CBS) Blossom (NBC)
 Davis Rules (ABC)
 Eerie, Indiana (NBC)
 Home Improvement (ABC)
 The Torkelsons (NBC)

Best Off-Prime Time or Cable Family Series
★ Harry and the Hendersons (FOX) The Adventures of the Black Stallion (Family Channel)
 Big Brother Jake (Family Channel)
 Land of the Lost (ABC)
 The New Lassie (KCOP)
 The New Zorro (Family Channel)

Outstanding New Animation Series
★ Back to the Future: The Animated Series (CBS) Darkwing Duck (ABC)
 Doug (Nickelodeon)
 Space Cats (NBC)
 Taz-Mania (FOX)
 Where in the World is Carmen Sandiego (PBS)
 Where's Waldo (CBS)

Best Family Motion Picture Entertainment

Best Family Motion Picture: Comedy
★ What About Bob? (Buena Vista) Bingo (Tri-Star)
 Don't Tell Mom the Babysitter's Dead (Warner Bros)
 Dutch (20th Century Fox)

Best Family Motion Picture: Drama
★ Robin Hood: Prince of Thieves (Warner Bros) The Doctor (Buena Vista)
 The NeverEnding Story II: The Next Chapter (Warner Bros)
 Paradise (Buena Vista)
 Regarding Henry (Paramount)
 Shipwrecked (Walt Disney)

Youth In Film's Special Awards

Inspiration To Youth
★ Gregory Scott, DirectorOutstanding Contribution to Children Through Music
★ Lisa Marie Nelson, ComposerThe Michael Landon Award

A Tribute
★ Michael Landon, Producer (Posthumous) – Accepted by Christopher LandonThe Mickey Rooney Award

Former Child Stars
★ Brandon Cruz & Gloria JeanMost Promising Young Newcomer
★ Edward FurlongHall of Fame Award
★ Christopher BurkeOutstanding Young Actor in a Foreign Film
★ Julien Ciamaca (France) – My Father's Glory & My Mother's Castle

Outstanding Young Actress in a Foreign Film
★ Marie Kleivdal Kristiansen (Norway) – Måker

Best Family Foreign Film
★ My Father's Glory & My Mother's Castle (France) – Directed by Yves Robert

References

External links
 Official site

Young Artist Awards ceremonies
1991 film awards
1991 television awards
Youth in Film Awards
1991 in American cinema
1991 in American television